Johanna Senfter ( 27 November 1879 – 11 August 1961) was a German composer.

Johanna Senfter was born and died in Oppenheim.  From 1895 she studied composition under Iwan Knorr, violin under Adolf Rebner, piano under Karl Friedberg and organ at the Hoch Conservatory in Frankfurt am Main. This gave her a considerable amount of musical training when in 1908 she became a student of Max Reger in Leipzig. She composed nine symphonies, 26 orchestral works and concertos for piano, violin, viola, and cello. Senfter was a masterful composer of fugue. Altogether she left behind 134 works.

Compositions

Discography
 Senfter: Compositions for Two Violins (Feminae Records, 2019)
 Concerto in C minor for Two Violins and String Orchestra, op. 40
 Performed by: Aleksandra Maslovaric (violin), Katarina Aleksic (violin), Budapest Symphony Orchestra
 Ten Old Dances for Two Violins, op. 91
 Performed by: Aleksandra Maslovaric (violin), Katarina Aleksic (violin)
 Available: 

 Feminae in Musica (Feminae Records, 2007)
 Elegie, op. 13, no. 3
 Performed by: Aleksandra Maslovaric (violin), Tania Fleischer (piano)
 Available:

References

1879 births
1961 deaths
People from Mainz-Bingen
People from Rhenish Hesse
German classical composers
20th-century classical composers
Women classical composers
Hoch Conservatory alumni
20th-century German composers
20th-century women composers